Pinus henryi, Henry's pine, is a species of conifer in the family Pinaceae.

Description 
The bark on mature P. henryi is scaly, fissured, and broken into large irregular plates, which are gray-brown in color and flaky. The twigs are thick, with new shoots appearing reddish-brown in color. Pollen cones appear in clusters at the base of new shoots, and are only 2 cm long. Seed cones are thin and woody, and bear a short stout spine.

Distribution 
P. henryi is typically considered to be endemic to China, found in the Chongqing, Hubei, Hunan, Shaanxi, and Sichuan provinces. Some sources also place it in the Vietnamese provinces of Ha Giang and Bac Kan.

References

External links

henryi
Endemic flora of China
Trees of China
Near threatened flora of Asia
Taxonomy articles created by Polbot